Charles Michael Adler (born October 2, 1956) is an American voice actor and voice director. He is known for his roles as Buster Bunny on Tiny Toon Adventures, Ed and Bev Bighead on Rocko's Modern Life and Ickis on Aaahh!!! Real Monsters. His credits also include Avengers Assemble, Brandy & Mr. Whiskers, Cow and Chicken, Earthworm Jim, G.I. Joe: Renegades, I Am Weasel and SWAT Kats: The Radical Squadron.

Early life
In the mid-1960s, Adler's family moved to Nanuet, New York and later to Massachusetts. He was given the nickname "Beanie" due to always wearing a Beanie cap. His sister Cheryl Adler is a psychotherapist who wrote the book Sober University.

Growing up, Adler was a self-described "TV junkie", and an avid fan of Rocky and Bullwinkle, The Three Stooges and Irene Ryan's Granny Moses from The Beverly Hillbillies.

Career
Adler's first professional acting job was in a commercial in 1971. Afterward, he took a hiatus from acting. During this time, he worked a variety of jobs, including waiter, janitor, paper delivery man, floor stripper, house painter, remedial reading teacher and caretaker for an Episcopal church.

In 1984 and 1985 he starred as Arnold Beckoff in Torch Song Trilogy, for which he was nominated for the 1985 Helen Hayes Best Actor Award, in New York City before moving to California in 1986.

Adler's first animation role was recorded in New York, voicing Spike in Rescue at Midnight Castle.

In 1985, after convincing the head of the Abrams, Rubiloff and Lawrence agency to allow him to audition for their voice-over department, Adler later attended a private audition for Ginny McSwain and Arlene Thornton. An agent had praised him in front of them as the "next Frank Welker". McSwain recalls that "he blew their minds" but he claims that initially they had no interest in him. Having no demo, they arranged for him to record an audition. He improvised characters during the tape, which impressed both McSwain and Thornton, however, left him so embarrassed with his performance that he performed with his back to them and his face hidden with a hat and sunglasses.

His voice acting career took off when Adler landed the roles of Nat Smurfling in the fourth season of The Smurfs, "Rowdy" Roddy Piper on Hulk Hogan's Rock 'n' Wrestling, Silverbolt on The Transformers and Eric Raymond, Techrat and Zipper in Jem.

He was disenchanted with live-action acting after working on The Redd Foxx Show, in which he portrayed Ralph/Rita. In an interview for The Magic Behind the Voices, Adler commented on the experience: "you spend your whole life going, "God, I just want to be in a TV show and have a parking space". Then I got it and it was just so not what I wanted to do."

He became active in animation, his roles include reprising Spike on My Little Pony, Low-Light on G.I. Joe, Mr. O'Greasy on A Pup Named Scooby-Doo, Deputy Fuzz and Tex Hex on Bravestarr, Cavey Jr. on The Flintstone Kids, Pinky Dalton on The Good, the Bad, and Huckleberry Hound, Quark and Zappy on Rockin' with Judy Jetson, the TurkeyBoy and sometimes Hamburglar in McDonald's commercials and The Wacky Adventures of Ronald McDonald, Mad Dog, Hacksaw, and Howard Huge in TaleSpin, Dripple on Tom and Jerry Kids, and the titular character on Paddington Bear.

In 1990, Adler lent his voice to Buster Bunny on Tiny Toon Adventures. Producer Tom Ruegger recalled that he and voice director Andrea Romano insisted Steven Spielberg cast him due to the "great deal of energy" he brought to Buster. In 1992, during the show's third season, he abruptly left the show after a disagreement with the producers; while voice actors with smaller roles in the show were given starring roles in its successor Animaniacs, he was offended when he was not offered a role in that series. John Kassir replaced him for the remainder of Tiny Toons.

In 1993, Adler went on to play Chance "T-Bone" Furlong on SWAT Kats: The Radical Squadron, Bill on The Terrible Thunderlizards, Ickis on Aaahh!!! Real Monsters, Ed and Bev Bighead on Rocko's Modern Life, Stalker Slaughter on Captain Planet and the Planeteers and Screwball Squirrel, as well as reprising Dripple for Droopy, Master Detective.

In 1995, Adler voiced several characters on What a Cartoon!. In the latter, he played Cow, Chicken and The Red Guy. No Smoking was a pilot created by David Feiss, which was greenlit to be a series in 1997 with him on board to reprise his characters, for a new series, titled I Am Weasel. Cow and Chicken ran from 1997 to 1999, receiving multiple awards and nominations, including an Annie Award for "Outstanding Individual Achievement for Voice Acting in an Animated Television Production" for Adler as Cow. Later on I Am Weasel was made into a spinoff series, in which he reprised the three characters and also voice I.R. Baboon.

His voice directing career began in the late 1990s with Rugrats and later collaborated with Klasky Csupo. Adler has directed The Wild Thornberrys,  Rocket Power, All Grown Up!,  The Marvelous Misadventures of Flapjack,  The Replacements, among others.

In 2002, Adler, with David Feiss and Michael Ryan, directed his own short film No Prom for Cindy.

Adler also voiced Dr. Peacock in Froot Loops commercials, Patrick Winks and Mr. Hornsby on Jakers! The Adventures of Piggley Winks, SAVO on Danger Rangers, Mr. Whiskers on Brandy & Mr. Whiskers, Optimatus on Loonatics Unleashed and Doctor Doom on The Super Hero Squad Show.

In 2007, Adler provided the voice of Starscream in Michael Bay's live-action Transformers film franchise. Just as Chris Latta voiced both Starscream and Cobra Commander in the Sunbow cartoons, Adler voiced Cobra Commander on G.I. Joe: Resolute and G.I. Joe: Renegades. He also voiced the titular character in the webtoon Inspector Beaver.

Adler was the guest of honor at the 2017 edition of AnthroCon.

His subsequent credits as voice director include Nickelodeon's Blaze and the Monster Machines, Wabbit (season 1), Kulipari: An Army of Frogs and Kung Fu Panda: The Paws of Destiny. He also plays MODOK on Avengers Assemble.

Filmography

Film

Animation

Video games

Live-action

Casting and voice director

 All Grown Up!
 As Told by Ginger
 Blaze and the Monster Machines
 Bratz (Season 1)
 Bratz Genie Magic
 Bratz Rock Angelz
 Bubble Guppies (Seasons 2–4)
 Dante's Inferno: An Animated Epic
 Dead Space: Downfall
 DreamWorks Dragons: Rescue Riders
 Harley Quinn
 Holly Hobbie and Friends: Christmas Wishes
 Immigrants
 Jimmy Neutron: Boy Genius
 Johnny Bravo Goes to Bollywood
 Kulipari
 Kung Fu Panda: The Paws of Destiny
 Madagascar: A Little Wild
 Marvel Super Hero Squad: Comic Combat
 Marvel Super Hero Squad: The Infinity Gauntlet
 Me, Eloise
 Rocket Power
 Rugrats
 Rugrats Go Wild
 Rugrats in Paris: The Movie
 Sabrina: Secrets of a Teenage Witch
 Stressed Eric
 Stripperella
 The Bob's Burgers Movie
 The Brothers Flub
 The Buzz on Maggie
 The Emperor's New School
 The Happy Elf
 The Marvelous Misadventures of Flapjack (Season 1)
 The Nutty Professor
 The Replacements
 The Rugrats Movie
 The Wacky Adventures of Ronald McDonald
 The Wild Thornberrys
 The Wild Thornberrys Movie
 Todd McFarlane's Spawn
 Top Cat Begins
 Wabbit (Season 1)

Awards and nominations

References

External links
 
 

1956 births
Living people
American casting directors
American male stage actors
American male television actors
American male television writers
American male video game actors
American male voice actors
American television writers
Hanna-Barbera people
People from Paterson, New Jersey
American voice directors
20th-century American male actors
21st-century American male actors